1997-98 was the 23rd season that Division 1 operated as the second tier of ice hockey in Sweden, below the top-flight Elitserien (now the SHL).

Format 
Division 1 was divided into four starting groups of 10 teams each (except for the Western Group, which only had nine). The top two teams in each group qualified for the Allsvenskan, while the remaining eight teams had to compete in a qualifying round. The teams were given zero to seven bonus points based on their finish in the first round. The top two teams in each qualifying round qualified for the playoffs. The 14 worst teams in the qualifying round had to play in a relegation round to decide their participation in the following season.

Of the eight teams in the Allsvenskan, the top two qualified directly for the Kvalserien. The third-sixth place teams qualified for the second round of the playoffs. The two playoff winners qualified for the Kvalserien, in which the top two teams qualified for the following Elitserien season.

Regular season

Northern Group

First round

Qualification round

Western Group

First round

Qualification round

Eastern Group

First round

Qualification round

Southern Group

First round

Qualification round

Promotion round

Allsvenskan

Playoffs

First round 
 Uppsala AIS - Rögle BK 4:4/2:3
 Skellefteå AIK - Örebro IK 2:2/5:2
 Tingsryds AIF - IFK Lidingö 3:2/2:5
 Bofors IK - Bodens IK 0:1/2:4

Second round 
 Skellefteå AIK - IF Björklöven 1:2/0:1
 Rögle BK - Mora IK 5:3/0:7
 Bodens IK - Timrå IK 1:5/2:3
 IFK Lidingö - Arlanda HC 4:6/5:2

Third round 
 IFK Lidingö - Timrå IK 2:7/3:4
 Mora IK - IF Björklöven 2:2/1:9

Kvalserien

Relegation round

Northern Group

Western Group

Eastern Group

Southern Group

External links 
Season on hockeyarchives.info

Swedish Division I seasons
Swed
2